Elizabeth Park may refer to:

 Elizabeth Park (Connecticut), a city park in Hartford and West Hartford, Connecticut
 Elizabeth Park (Newfoundland), a park in Paradise, Newfoundland
 Elizabeth Park (Michigan), a county park in Trenton, Michigan
 Elizabeth Park, South Australia, a northern suburb of Adelaide
 Uplands, Ottawa, a neighbourhood in Ottawa, Canada, also known as Elizabeth Park

See also
 Elizabeth Parker (disambiguation)
 Queen Elizabeth Park (disambiguation)